Pamela Youde Nethersole Eastern Hospital, known as Eastern Hospital or Youde Hospital is a acute district general hospital in Chai Wan, Hong Kong, There is an Emergency Radiation Therapy Center in Hong Kong, Another part Emergency Radiation Therapy Center at Tuen Mun Hospital.

The hospital opened on 15 October 1993 with 1829 beds and staff of over 3000. It replaced the original Alice Ho Miu Ling Nethersole Hospital in Mid-Levels in Hong Kong Island and moved to Chai Wan. Assigned to the Hong Kong eastern hospital cluster and replaced the other Nethersole hospital, which relocated to the New Territories.

It is affiliated with the Li Ka Shing Faculty of Medicine, the University of Hong Kong, providing clinical attachment opportunities for its medical students.

History
Before the establishment of the Hospital, there were only three government clinics but no hospitals in the Eastern District, a district with a population of 440,000 in the 1980s. In August 1982, several churches in the district formed an organisation to lobby the government to establish a hospital there.

After the sudden death of Governor Edward Youde in 1986, the Eastern District Board in February 1987 formally endorsed a proposal to name the new hospital after Lady Youde. The Pamela Youde Nethersole Eastern Hospital commenced services on 15 October 1993. It was officially opened by Governor Chris Patten on 23 June 1994. When Pamela Youde Nethersole Eastern Hospital opened, the accident and emergency unit of the Chai Wan Health Centre moved to the new complex.

The Hospital Authority plans to expand the hospital onto the site of the Chai Wan Laundry, which will be relocated to a proposed Supporting Services Centre in Tin Shui Wai New Town.

Services
Pamela Youde Nethersole Eastern Hospital is the only hospital in Hong Kong houses pressure chamber to provide Hyperbaric Oxygen Therapy (HBOT) service, which can be used to treat conditions such as air or gas embolism, carbon monoxide poisoning, central retinal artery occlusion (CRAO), decompression sickness, etc.

The hospital is the only hospital with helipad on Hong Kong island, and one of the two hospitals in Hong Kong (Pamela Youde Nethersole Eastern Hospital and Tuen Mun Hospital). It receives emergency patients transferred by Government Flying Services. And also provides emergency medical consultation to remote island clinics (e.g. St. John Hospital in Cheung Chau).

Pamela Youde Nethersole Eastern Hospital was one of two hospitals (the other being Tuen Mun Hospital) equipped with dedicated Emergency Radiation Treatment Centres (ERTCs), provided in response to concerns surrounding the 1993-1994 commissioning of the Daya Bay Nuclear Power Plant in nearby Shenzhen. Under the Hong Kong government's Daya Bay Contingency Plan, the two centres will treat and decontaminate persons affected by a nuclear accident.

, the hospital has 1,633 beds and around 4,993 full-time equivalent members of staff. For the year ended 31 March 2014, it has treated 152,332 patients in the Accidental and Emergency Department, 138,724 inpatients and day-patients, 560,842 specialist outpatients, and 393,573 general outpatients.

Clinical departments

Allied health departments
Allied health professions are health care professions distinct from nursing, medicine, and pharmacy.

References

External links

  

Hospital buildings completed in 1993
Hospitals in Hong Kong
Medical Services by Protestant Churches in Hong Kong
Chai Wan
Hospitals established in 1993
1993 establishments in Hong Kong